The Veiled One is a novel by British crime-writer Ruth Rendell. It is the 14th entry in the Inspector Wexford series.

References

1988 British novels
Novels by Ruth Rendell
Hutchinson (publisher) books
Inspector Wexford series